Hamid al-Saadi (born 1958) is the foremost singer of Iraqi Maqam – a form of Arab poetry, sung in a traditional way.  He has mastered all 56 pieces in the repertoire of Baghdad and now performs them in America, having moved to New York in 2018.

References

1958 births
20th-century Iraqi male singers
Living people
21st-century Iraqi male singers